Evil Star is the name of two supervillains appearing in DC Comics publications.

Publication history
The Guy Pompton version of Evil Star debuted in All Star Comics #44 and was created by John Broome and Irwin Hasen.

The alien version of Evil Star first appeared in Green Lantern (vol. 2) #37 (June 1965) and was created by Gardner Fox and Gil Kane.

Fictional character biography

Guy Pompton

Guy Pompton, owner of Ace Movie Rental Agency and a crimelord, dons a costumed identity in 1948 to stop a movie studio from completing a film using a script that will expose his criminal activities. He fights the Justice Society of America and is defeated.

Unknown

A scientist on the planet Auron dedicates himself to cheating death by drawing power from the stars themselves. He invents the Starband, which makes him immortal, but twists his mind toward evil and prematurely ages his fellow Aurons. The people of Auron want him to destroy the Starband, but having tasted immortality he refuses to give it up. The ensuing battle leaves all of Auron lifeless except for the scientist, now known as Evil Star. Evil Star seeks new worlds to conquer and comes into frequent conflict with the Guardians of the Universe and the Green Lanterns, including Hal Jordan.

The Guardians later send Evil Star to the Erral Rehab Facility, where they use a brainwave nullifier in an attempt to cure him. This rehabilitation is only partially successful, as the nullifier stimulates his subconscious mind, recreating the Starlings, who bring him the Starband. Evil Star flees to Earth in a confused state, believing the Starlings are persecuting him. He fights with Ferrin Colos, one of the Darkstars, who floods Evil Star's mind with reminders of the lives he has taken, starting with his homeworld. Evil Star's mind shuts down, and he is returned to the Guardians for re-education.

Evil Star is freed by Neron, with enhanced Starlings, but returned to captivity by the Darkstars and Guy Gardner.

Evil Star was mentioned, seemingly in passing, by Sister Sercy of the Blue Lantern Corps as a menace to her homeworld. It is unknown if the Evil Star she refers to is a past version, or a previously unheard-of version of the villain.

Evil Star is also cited as the guiding force behind the Kroloteans abducting William Hand, searching Hand's insides for the blackness that would lead to the Blackest Night.

Evil Star appears in Grant Morrison and Liam Sharp's The Green Lantern. Slavers from Dhor free him from the Southern Supervoid where he was being incarcerated by the Guardians of the Universe. They then attack him and remove his Starbrand, which was preserving his youth, causing him to rapidly age. They abandon him, near death, in Sector 2814 where he is hospitalized.

Powers and abilities
Evil Star's primary weapon is the Starband. The Starband draws the energy of the stars to prolong Evil Star's lifespan, enable him to fly, survive in space, create force blasts or hard light constructs, and powers the Starlings. Starlings are miniature versions of Evil Star that possess superhuman strength and invulnerability, and are under his complete control. Starlings need direct commands from Evil Star to function, and they become directionless if he is unconscious. If Evil Star is kept away from starlight for a prolonged period, his powers fade away. Since starlight is the same as sunlight, the Starband's force blasts and constructs serve to increase Superman's powers.

Other versions
Evil Star has appeared in some Elseworlds stories:

Batman: In Darkest Knight
In the Elseworlds tale, Batman: In Darkest Knight, a version of Evil Star exists. Harvey Dent was the Gotham District Attorney and was shown to be more supportive of Green Lantern than Commissioner Gordon. Sinestro, after becoming deranged from absorbing Joe Chill's mind, scarred Dent's face and empowered him along with Selina Kyle (known as Star Sapphire) and sent them out to kill the Green Lantern, with Dent known as 'Binary Star. Even though they were defeated, the pair managed to escape back to Sinestro.

JLA: Another Nail
In the Elseworlds tale, JLA: Another Nail, the follow-up to JLA: The Nail, Evil Star makes an appearance.

In other media

Television
 Evil Star appears in The Superman/Aquaman Hour of Adventure "Green Lantern" segment episode "Evil is as Evil Does", voiced by Paul Frees.
 Evil Star appears in Justice League Unlimited, voiced by an uncredited George Newbern. Following a minor appearance in the episode "The Cat and the Canary" as a participant in Roulette's Meta-Brawl, he joins Gorilla Grodd's Secret Society as of the episode "I Am Legion". Prior to and during the episodes "Alive!" and "Destroyer", Lex Luthor takes command of the Society, but Grodd mounts a mutiny. Evil Star sides with the former before Darkseid kills most of the Society, though Luthor and Evil Star, among others, survive to return to Earth, warn the Justice League, and join forces with them to repel Darkseid's invasion.
 Evil Star appears in the Batman: The Brave and the Bold episode "Revenge of the Reach!", voiced by J. K. Simmons.

Video games
Evil Star appears in DC Universe Online, voiced by Joey Hood.

Miscellaneous
 Evil Star appears in a Justice League tie-in novel.
 Evil Star appears in the DC Super Heroes illustrated children's book Beware Our Power!, written by Scott Sonneborn and published by Capstone Publishers.

References

Characters created by Gardner Fox
Characters created by Gil Kane
Comics characters introduced in 1948
Comics characters introduced in 1965
DC Comics aliens
DC Comics extraterrestrial supervillains
DC Comics supervillains
Golden Age supervillains